The Malling series is a group of rootstocks for grafting apple trees. It was developed at the East Malling Research Station of the South-Eastern Agricultural College at Wye in Kent, England. From about 1912, Ronald Hatton and his colleagues rationalised, standardised and catalogued the various rootstocks in use in Europe at the time under names such as Doucin and Paradise. Their first list had nine rootstock varieties, assigned the "type" numbers I–IX. The list later grew to twenty-four, and the Roman numerals gave way to Arabic numerals with the prefix "Malling" or "M.". From about 1917, collaboration between East Malling and the John Innes Institute, in Merton Park in Surrey, gave rise to the Malling-Merton series, which were resistant to Eriosoma lanigerum, the woolly apple aphid. 

Relative size are dependent on climate, variety and soil.

a) East Malling vd= very dwarf,  d= dwarf, sd= semidwarf, sv= semivigorous, v= vigorous, vv= very vigorous.

b) Tukey, Dwarfed fruit trees, 1964 d= dwarf, sd=semidwarf, ss= semistandard, s= standard.

c) Tukey, Dwarfed fruit trees, 1964   6= highest winter hardiness, 2= lowest winter hardiness.

References

Links
 Rootstock
 Rootstocks
 List and description of rootstocks
 Apple rootstock identification — NSW Department of Primary Industries — Series: Agfact H4.1.10 – Edition: Second edition – Last updated: 12 Jun 2001
 Apple Rootstock Fact Sheets, listed by size class

Apple cultivars
Science and technology in Kent
Tonbridge and Malling